Franz Hünten, otherwise known as François Hünten (26 December 179222 February 1878), was a German pianist and composer of salon music.

He was born in Koblenz, the son of the organist Daniel Hünten, who taught Henri Herz. Like Herz he moved to Paris and entered its Conservatorium in 1819. He wrote pleasant and technically undemanding piano music: rondos, fantasies, variations, dances, etc. Of Hünten’s 267 published works, the vast majority were written for piano solo or duet. His first success was Variations militaires à 4 mains, op. 12, a simple imitation of Ignaz Moscheles's variations on the Alexandermarsch, and soon his popularity was such that for one work of ten pages he was paid 2000 francs. Two years after publishing the instruction book Nouvelle méthode pour le piano-forte, op. 60 (1833), he moved back to Koblenz, where he continued to compose; he moved back to Paris after a few years but retired for good in 1848.

Hünten's music was wildly popular throughout France, Germany, and England, but critical notices inevitably described it as trifling and later assessments have been much the same. His brothers, Wilhelm, a piano teacher at Koblenz, and Peter Ernst, a piano teacher at Duisburg, also composed piano music of a similar character. His son, Emil Hünten, was a painter.

Bibliography
Gerd Zöllner: Franz Hünten. Sein Leben und Werk. Beiträge zur rheinischen Musikgeschichte 34, Köln 1959 (Diss. Köln)

External links

Notes

1792 births
1878 deaths
19th-century German pianists
German composers